The 2015 Cavan Senior Football Championship was the 107th edition of Cavan GAA's premier club Gaelic football tournament for senior graded teams in County Cavan, Ireland. The tournament consists of 17 teams, with the winner going on to represent Cavan in the Ulster Senior Club Football Championship.

Cavan Gaels were the defending champions, having defeated Kingscourt Stars in the previous years final. Kingscourt ended their reign at the quarter-final stage.

Kingscourt went on to win the championship by beating Castlerahan in the final. This was their 11th title overall, and their first since 2010.

Team Changes
The following teams have changed division since the 2014 championship season.

To Championship
Promoted from 2014 Cavan Intermediate Football Championship
  Cootehill  -  (Intermediate Champions)

From Championship
Relegated to 2015 Cavan Intermediate Football Championship
  Redhills

Opening rounds

Preliminary rounds

Round 1

Round 2A

Back-door stage

Round 2B

Round 3

Knock-out stages

Quarter-finals

Semi-finals

Final

Relegation play-offs

Preliminary relegation play-off

Relegation Finals

References

External links
 Cavan at ClubGAA
 Official Cavan GAA Website

Cavan Senior Football Championship
Cavan Senior Football Championship